João Guilherme Leme Amorim (born 21 April 1986) is a Brazilian professional footballer who plays as a centre back.

Career

Internacional
João Guilherme started his career with Brazilian powerhouse Internacional where he played a total of 16 games, and scored 1 goal.

Marítimo
In January 2008, Guilherme was officially announced as the first reinforcement of the year of Portuguese Liga club C.S. Marítimo, after completing a deal worth €200,000. He was signed along with Internacional teammate Bruno Grassi, both of whom joined up with former teammates Marcelo Boeck, Ediglê and Márcio Mossoró, who all signed for Marítimo earlier in the season from Internacional. He played for Maritimo from 2008 until 2013, appearing in 109 games and scoring 5 goals.

APOEL
On 14 June 2013, after six Portuguese Liga seasons, he signed a two-year contract with APOEL from Cyprus. He made his APOEL debut against NK Maribor at GSP Stadium on 31 July 2013, in a 1–1 first leg draw for the third qualifying round of the 2013–14 UEFA Champions League. He scored his first official goal for APOEL on 2 September 2013, in his team's 3–0 home win against Enosis Neon Paralimni for the Cypriot First Division. During the 2013–14 season, he appeared in four 2013–14 UEFA Europa League group stage matches for APOEL and won all the titles in Cyprus, the Cypriot League, the Cypriot Cup and the Cypriot Super Cup.

The next season, he appeared in five group stage matches in APOEL's 2014–15 UEFA Champions League campaign. 
On 19 December 2014, Guilherme signed a two-year contract extension with APOEL, running until June 2017. On 14 June 2016, one month after he won his third consecutive Cypriot First Division title with the club, João Guilherme's contract with APOEL was mutually terminated.

International career
João Guilherme was the captain of the Brazil under-17 team that won the 2003 FIFA U-17 World Cup, appearing in all Brazil's matches and helping his team to win the trophy.

Club statistics

Honours

Club
APOEL
Cypriot First Division: 2013–14, 2014–15, 2015–16
Cypriot Cup: 2013–14, 2014–15
Cypriot Super Cup: 2013

International
Brazil U17
FIFA Under-17 World Cup: 2003

References

External links

João Guilherme at ZeroZero

1986 births
Living people
Brazilian footballers
Brazil youth international footballers
Brazilian expatriate footballers
C.S. Marítimo players
APOEL FC players
Al-Fateh SC players
Sport Club Internacional players
Bangu Atlético Clube players
Esporte Clube Cruzeiro players
Volta Redonda FC players
Sociedade Esportiva Recreativa e Cultural Brasil players
Primeira Liga players
Cypriot First Division players
Saudi Professional League players
Expatriate footballers in Portugal
Expatriate footballers in Saudi Arabia
Expatriate footballers in Cyprus
Brazilian expatriate sportspeople in Portugal
Brazilian expatriate sportspeople in Saudi Arabia
Brazilian expatriate sportspeople in Cyprus
Association football central defenders